Podzilla:
PODZILLA is a patented lift system used by PODS 
Podzilla (GUI), used in iPodLinux
Scott Podsednik, baseball player for the Chicago White Sox
Podzilla, the resident monster truck of Santa Pod Raceway

es:Podzilla
nl:Podzilla